The 2003 Senior British Open was a senior major golf championship and the 17th Senior British Open, held from 24–27 July at Turnberry in South Ayrshire, Scotland. It was the 5th Senior British Open played at the course and the first Senior British Open played as a senior major championship.

Tom Watson defeated Carl Mason in a playoff to win his first Senior British Open title. The 2003 event was Watson's second senior major championship victory.

Venue

The 2003 event was the 5th Senior British Open played at Turnberry.

Course layout

Field
The field consisted of 144 competitors: 139 professionals and 5 amateurs.

18-hole stroke play qualifying rounds were held on Monday, 21 July, on two places in Scotland, the Barassie Links in Kilmarnock and the Kintyre course at Turnberry, for players who were not already exempt. The 31 leading players from the qualifying competitions joined the 113 exempt players for the championship.

77 players made the 36-hole cut, 76 professionals and one amateur. Arthur Pierce, Ireland, finished leading amateur at tied 62nd.

Nationalities in the field

Past champions in the field

Made the cut

Missed the cut

Past winners and runners-up at The Open Championship in the field 
The field included five former winners of The Open Championship. Four of them made the cut; 1975, 1977, 1980, 1982 and 1983 Open champion Tom Watson (won), 1966, 1970 and 1978 Open champion Jack Nicklaus (tied 14th), 1963 Open champion Bob Charles (tied 20th) and 1959, 1968 and 1974 Open champion Gary Player (tied 51st). 1961 and 1962 Open champion Arnold Palmer did not make the cut.

The field also included three former runners-up at The Open Championship; Tom Kite (4th), Rodger Davis (tied 27th) and Simon Owen (tied 32nd).

Round summaries

First round
Thursday, 24 July 2003

Tom Kite and Tom Watson posted four-under-par 66's on day one to lead by one shot.

Second round
Friday 25 July 2003

Carl Mason shot a 64 (−6) to take a one-shot lead over D.A. Weibring, who shot a seven-under-par 63.

Amateurs: Pierse (−1), Reynolds (+5), Boles (+9), Baldwin (+11), MacNamara (+15)

Third round
Saturday, 26 July 2003

Mason and Weibring shot matching rounds of 65 (−5) as Mason maintained his one shot lead. Kite, Summerhays, and Watson all shot rounds of 66 (−4) to trail Mason by three shots. Jim Colbert backed up his eight-under-par 62 with a 66 (−4) in the third round, trailing Mason by 4 strokes.

Amateurs: Pierse (+2)

Final round
Sunday, 27 July 2003

Tom Watson trailed Carl Mason by one stroke heading into the 72nd hole. Needing birdie to tie Mason, Watson bogeyed the par-4 18th hole to fall two shots behind the leader. Mason, now leading by 2 strokes, double bogeyed the 18th hole and fell into a playoff with Watson. 

Source:
Amateurs: Pierse (+6)

Playoff
Sunday, 27 July 2003

Tom Watson and Carl Mason both parred the first playoff hole. Watson won with par on the second playoff hole as Mason made bogey.

Notes and references

External links
Results on European Tour website
Results on PGA Tour website

Senior major golf championships
Golf tournaments in Scotland
Senior British Open
Senior British Open
Senior British Open